Don't Ever Open That Door (Spanish:No abras nunca esa puerta) is a 1952 Argentine thriller film directed by Carlos Hugo Christensen and starring Ángel Magana, Roberto Escalada and Norma Giménez. It is a film noir in two separate episodes, both based on short stories by Cornell Woolrich.

The film's sets were designed by the art director Gori Muñoz.

In 2022, it was included in the list of The 100 Greatest Films of Argentine Cinema at number 45, a poll organized by the specialized magazines La vida útil, Taipei and La tierra quema, which was presented at the Mar del Plata International Film Festival.

Cast
 Ángel Magana
 Roberto Escalada
 Ilde Pirovano
 Nicolás Fregues
 Arnoldo Chamot as Camarero  
 Carlos D'Agostino as Relator radial 
 Diana de Córdoba
 Rafael Diserio 
 Renée Dumas 
 Pedro Fiorito 
 Norma Giménez 
 Rosa Martín 
 Luis Mora 
 Percival Murray as Policia 
 Luis Otero 
 Alberto Quiles 
 Orestes Soriani as Gerente de banco

References

Bibliography
 Spicer, Andrew. Historical Dictionary of Film Noir. Scarecrow Press, 2010.

External links
 

1952 films
Argentine thriller films
Film noir
1950s Spanish-language films
Argentine black-and-white films
Films directed by Carlos Hugo Christensen
Films based on multiple works
Films based on works by Cornell Woolrich
Films scored by Julián Bautista
1950s thriller films
1950s Argentine films